Run for Cover may refer to:


Music 
Run for Cover Records, an independent record label founded in 2004

Albums
Run for Cover (Gary Moore album), 1985, or the title song
Run for Cover (The Living Sisters album), 2013

Songs
"Run for Cover", a 1955 title song by Jackson/Brooks for the Run for Cover western movie
"Run for Cover" (Lee Perry song), a 1967 song by Lee "Scratch" Perry
"Run for Cover", a 1970 song by The Wailers released on their record label Tuff Gong
"Run for Cover", a 1976 song by Streetwalkers from the album Red Card
"Run for Cover", a 1981 song by David Sanborn from the album Voyeur
"Run for Cover", a 1983 song by Quiet Riot from Metal Health
"Run for Cover", a 1987 song by Basia from her Time and Tide album
"Run for Cover", a 1990 song by Eric B. & Rakim from Let the Rhythm Hit 'Em
"Run for Cover", a 1998 promo song by Flipmode Squad (Busta Rhymes) from The Imperial
"Run for Cover" (Sugababes song), a 2001 Sugababes song
"Run 4 Cover", a 2006 song by Basement Jaxx from the Crazy Itch Radio album, in turn from the soundtrack Marc 2 The Final Chapters
"Run for Cover", a 2006 song by KJ-52 from KJ-52 Remixed
"Run for Cover", a 2009 EP and title song by Joni Fuller
"Run for Cover", a 2013 single by Blitz Kids (rock band)
"Run for Cover" (The Killers song), a 2017 song by The Killers

Film 
Run for Cover (film), a 1955 film directed by Nicholas Ray and starring James Cagney
Run for Cover, a 1995 film written and directed by Richard W. Haines